The 1995–96 National Hurling League, known for sponsorship reasons as the Church & General National Hurling League, was the 65th edition of the National Hurling League, which ran from 7 October 1995 until 12 May 1996. Galway won, beating Tipperary in the final.

Structure
There are eight teams in each division. Each plays each other team once, home or away, and receives two points for a win and one for a draw.

The top two teams in Division 1 advance to the semi-finals. The third- and fourth-placed teams in Division 1 go into the quarter-finals, as do the top two teams in Division 2.

The top two teams in Divisions 2, 3 and 4 are promoted for the following season. The bottom two in Divisions 1, 2 and 3 are relegated.

Division 1

Table

Group stage

Knock-out stage

Quarter-finals

Semi-finals

Final

Scoring statistics

Top scorers overall

Top scorers in a single game

Division 2

Table

References

National Hurling League seasons
League
League